Ray Nkonyeni Local Municipality is a local municipality of South Africa. It is located on the south coast of KwaZulu-Natal. It was established after the August 2016 local elections by the merging of Ezinqoleni and Hibiscus Coast local municipalities.

Politics 

The municipal council consists of seventy-one members elected by mixed-member proportional representation. Thirty-six councillors are elected by first-past-the-post voting in thirty-six wards, while the remaining thirty-five are chosen from party lists so that the total number of party representatives is proportional to the number of votes received. In the election of 3 August 2016 the African National Congress (ANC) won a majority of forty-seven seats on the council.
The following table shows the results of the election.

References

Local municipalities of the Ugu District Municipality
KwaZulu-Natal South Coast